The Four Evangelists is an oil on canvas painting by the Flemish Baroque artist Jacob Jordaens, completed in 1625. The painting is 133 by 118 centimeters. and is in the Musée du Louvre, Paris, France.

Description 
The Four Evangelists, Matthew, Mark, Luke, and John (the authors of the Gospels), are represented together engaged in study and discussion.

References 

1625 paintings
Paintings by Jacob Jordaens
Jordaens
Jordaens
Jordaens
Jordaens
Paintings in the Louvre by Dutch, Flemish and German artists
Books in art